Mauritia depressa, common name the "depressed cowry" or the "honey cowry", is a species of sea snail, a cowry, a marine gastropod mollusk in the family Cypraeidae, the cowries.

Description
The dorsal color pattern varies from yellowish brown to dark brown, with distinct, almost circular, clear spots. The edges usually are pale bluish or yellowish, with several brown dots. The base is definitely flattened, its colour may be white, pale brown or pale bluish. The teeth along the aperture are dark brown on both lips.

Distribution
 This species occurs in the Central Pacific Ocean and in the Indian Ocean along Chagos, the Comores, Kenya, Madagascar, the Mascarene Basin, Mauritius, Réunion, Tanzania, Lakkadiven Islands, Timor, Philippines and French Polynesia.

Habitat
These cowries mainly live in shallow water, in coral reefs or in lagoons near the wave-swept edges, from the intertidal zone to  depth, usually under coral slabs or rocks. They are active at night, when they feed on algal crests.

Subspecies
 Mauritia depressa dispersa  Schilder & Schilder, 1939

References

Footnotes
 Verdcourt, B. (1954). The cowries of the East African Coast (Kenya, Tanganyika, Zanzibar and Pemba). Journal of the East Africa Natural History Society 22(4) 96: 129-144, 17 pls.
 Poutiers, J.M. 1998 - Gastropods. p. 363 – 648.
 Carpenter, K. E. and V. H. Niem. 1998. FAO species identification guide for fishery purposes. The living marine resources of the Western Central Pacific. Volume 1. Seaweeds, corals, bivalves, and gastropods. Rome, FAO.

External links
 Biolib
 
 Sealife

Cypraeidae
Gastropods described in 1824
Taxa named by John Edward Gray